Xanthosine 5'-triphosphate (XTP) is a nucleotide that is not produced by - and has no known function in - living cells. Uses of XTP are, in general, limited to experimental procedures on enzymes that bind other nucleotides. Deamination of purine bases can result in accumulation of such nucleotides as ITP, dITP, XTP, and dXTP.

References

See also
 Xanthosine
 Xanthosine monophosphate

Nucleotides
Phosphate esters
Xanthines